"Come On" is a song by the Scottish alternative rock group The Jesus and Mary Chain and the second single from the group's album Stoned & Dethroned. It was released by Blanco y Negro Records in October 1994 and reached #52 in the UK single charts.

Track listing
All tracks written by Jim Reid, except where noted.

7" (NEG73)
"Come On" – 2:32
"I'm In With The Out Crowd" - 2:37

12" (NEG73T) and CDS (NEG73CD)
"Come On" – 2:32
"New York City" (William Reid) - 1:59
"Taking It Away" (Ben Lurie) - 2:12
"I'm In With The Out Crowd" - 2:37

CDS (NEG73CD2)
"Come On" – 2:32
"Ghost Of A Smile" (Shane MacGowan) - 2:55
"Alphabet St." (Prince) - 2:17
"New Kind Of Kick (Live)" (Lux Interior, Ivy Rorschach) (recorded at UC San Diego, California, USA, on 11 November 1992) - 2:49

Personnel
The Jesus and Mary Chain
 Jim Reid - vocals, guitar, production
 William Reid - guitar, production

Additional personnel
 Steve Monti - drums
 Dick Meaney - engineer
 Nick Addison  - engineer ("I'm In With The Out Crowd")

References

The Jesus and Mary Chain songs
1994 singles
Songs written by Jim Reid
1994 songs
Blanco y Negro Records singles
Jangle pop songs